The Crown Solicitor of South Australia provides legal services to South Australian government Ministers, agencies and departments.

With the establishment of the Province of South Australia, the colony's first First Law Officer Charles Mann was appointed Advocate-General, Crown Solicitor and Public Prosecutor.  The appointment as Advocate-General bestowed the office holder with membership of the Council in Government.  With the arrival of self government in 1857, the position of Advocate-General became that of Attorney-General.

In the early days of the colony the titles of Advocate-General, Crown Solicitor and Public Prosecutor were bestowed together.  That changed in 1850 due to the ill-health of then Advocate-General, William Smillie.  As a consequence of Smillie's ill-health, the position of Crown Solicitor was given to Charles Mann.  Mann briefly held the title of Acting Advocate-General before resigning that position in favour of Richard Hanson. Hanson became South Australia's last Advocate-General and the provinces first Attorney-General in the inaugural Parliament in 1857.

Since 1850, the position of Crown Solicitor has been a public sector employee.  The current Crown Solicitor of South Australia, as of 8 November 2021, is Ingrid Norman.

List of Advocates-General of South Australia (1837 to 1851)

List of Crown Solicitors of South Australia (1851 to 2021)

References

Advocates
Advocates
Advocates